School of Chocolate is a Netflix reality competition series hosted by Swiss-French pastry chef, artist and chocolatier Amaury Guichon and produced by Super Delicious Productions. Eight contestants compete against each other in a series of innovative cooking challenges, creating elaborate chocolate sculptures as they aim for the title of  'best in the class' and a monetary prize sum of $50,000. Guichon acts as both a mentor and a judge to the contestants. The series premiered on Netflix on 26 November 2021.

Contestants
Amanda Miller
Cedrick Simpson
Daniel Joseph Corpuz
Juan Gutierrez
Mellisa Root
Stephanie Norcio
Thiago Silva
Tyricia Clark

Episodes

Production
The series was announced in August 2021 as part of Netflix's culinary slate with Amaury Guichon set to host the competition. Adam Cohen, Cara Tapper, Joanna Vernetti, Jeanne Begley, and Andrea Richter are executive producers of the series. A trailer for the series was first released on 15 November 2021.

Reception 
Mashable gave the first season a positive review, remarking on the advance away from the cut-throat traditional format of similar competitive reality shows, in the school of chocolate there is no elimination of participants from subsequent episodes.

References

External links

2020s American cooking television series
2020s American reality television series
2021 American television series debuts
English-language Netflix original programming
Food reality television series
Chocolate culture
Reality competition television series